MV Cape Pine is a charter boat operated by the Maritime Heritage Society of Vancouver. She began life as USS SC-715, a SC-497-class submarine chaser of the United States Navy. She was later transferred to the United States Coast Guard and served under the name USCGC Air Killdeer (WAVR 433). Finally sold into mercantile service, as the Cape Pine, she worked as a high-endurance fish packer in the fisheries of the Canadian coast, and was then sold to the Maritime Heritage Society of Vancouver.

Service history

Construction
SC-715 was laid down at the Fisher Boat Works in Detroit, Michigan on 14 May 1942, launched on 23 October 1942 and commissioned into the navy on 4 December 1942.

US Navy service during WWII
SC-715 served in the Atlantic and Pacific during World War II. After the war she was decommissioned at Seattle.

Post-war US Coast Guard service
Transferred to the United States Coast Guard on 9 January 1946, SC-715 was renamed USCGC Air Killdeer. In this capacity she was used in offshore rescue duties. She was one of 70 such vessels transferred to the coastguard to cope with the problem of large numbers of aviation accidents as troops and personnel were returned to the United States after the war, in Operation Magic Carpet. The shortage of experienced pilots as enlisted men were discharged caused the number of accidents to rise. Manpower shortages also affected the Coastguard, which at times struggled to crew the rescue vessels. After two years Air Killdeer was sold to a Canadian fishing company in British Columbia, on 19 January 1948.

Fish factory boat
She was registered as Cape Pine on 14 May 1951. Her new owners re-powered and modified the former submarine chaser to convert her to a high-endurance fish packer in support of the salmon and herring fisheries on the west coast of Canada.

Charter boat
Cape Pine is still afloat, having been sold to the Maritime Heritage Society in Vancouver, and is in operation as a private pleasure boat and charter boat out of Pender Harbour, British Columbia, Canada.

See also 
 Other ships built by Fisher Boat Works:
 HNoMS Hitra
 USS SC-499
 USS SC-500

References

External links
Web page of the Cape Pine
Photo of SC-715 in Hawaii in 1944

SC-497-class submarine chasers
Ships built in Detroit
1942 ships
Ships transferred from the United States Navy to the United States Coast Guard